Šarišský Štiavnik is a village in north-eastern Slovakia.

History
In historical records the village was first mentioned in 1567.

Geography
The municipality lies at an altitude of 236 metres and covers an area of 5.273 km². It has a population of about 295 people.

References

External links
 
 

Villages and municipalities in Svidník District
Šariš